Irulum Oliyum is a 1971 Indian Tamil-language romantic drama film, directed and co-written by Puttanna Kanagal. A remake of Kanagal's own Kannada film Kappu Bilupu (1969), itself based on a novel by Aryammba Pattabi, it stars Vanisri in dual roles with A. V. M. Rajan and R. Muthuraman. It was again remade by the same director in telugu as Iddaru Ammayilu with Vanisri reprising her role. The film revolves around two lookalike cousin sisters who switch places for a few days to escape from their respective problems. It was released on 10 September 1971 and became a commercial success.

Plot

Cast 
 Vanisri as Banu and Chandra
 A. V. M. Rajan as Thyagu
 R. Muthuraman as Ramu
 S. V. Ranga Rao as Mohanarangam, Banu's father
 Nagesh as Mohanarangam's assistant
 S. V. Subbaiah as Dharmalingam, Chandra's father
 Rama Prabha as Rama, Chandra's step sister 
 M. S. Sundari Bai as Amritham, Chandra's stepmother
 Senthamarai as Nagalingam, Amritham's brother
 V. Nagayya as Chandrasekhar, Thyagu's father
 Rukmini as Gowri, Thyagu's mother
 Vennira Aadai Moorthy as Amritham's brother's son

Production 
Irulum Oliyum was directed by Puttanna Kanagal, who also wrote the screenplay, while Vietnam Veedu Sundaram wrote the dialogues. It is a remake of Kanagal's own Kannada film Kappu Bilupu (1969), itself based on a novel by Aryamba Pattabhi. Cinematography was handled by S. Maruti Rao, and editing by M. Umanath Rao. Ra. Sankaran and Bharathiraja worked as associate directors.

Soundtrack 
Music was by K. V. Mahadevan and lyrics were by Kannadasan.

Release and reception 
Irulum Oliyum was released on 10 September 1971, and fared well at the box office.

References

External links 
 

1970s Tamil-language films
1971 films
1971 romantic drama films
Films based on adaptations
Films directed by Puttanna Kanagal
Films scored by K. V. Mahadevan
Indian romantic drama films
Tamil remakes of Kannada films